Amen Aamir, in Urdu: آمین عامر, is an aviator from Gilgit-Baltistan, who is the first woman from the region to qualify as a commercial pilot. Born in Skardu, she was inspired to become a pilot after a school visit to a Pakistan Air Force base. She learnt to fly at the Rawalpindi Flying Club. Her first solo flight took place on 19 December 2015. She graduated as a commercial pilot in 2017.

References

External links 

 

Year of birth missing (living people)
Living people
People from Gilgit-Baltistan
Pakistani women
Pakistani aviators
Women aviators
Women aviation pioneers